
Gmina Susz is an urban-rural gmina (administrative district) in Iława County, Warmian-Masurian Voivodeship, in northern Poland.

The gmina contains part of the protected area called Iława Lake District Landscape Park.

Villages
Apart from the town of Susz, Gmina Susz contains the villages and settlements of Adamowo, Babięty Małe, Babięty Wielkie, Bałoszyce, Bałoszyce Małe, Boleszów, Bornice, Bronowo, Brusiny, Brusiny Małe, Chełmżyca, Czerwona Woda, Dąbrówka, Dolina, Emilianowo, Fabianki, Falknowo, Falknowo Małe, Grabowiec, Huta, Jakubowo Kisielickie, Janowo, Januszewo, Jawty Małe, Jawty Wielkie, Kamieniec, Karolewo, Krzywiec, Lisiec, Lubnowy Małe, Lubnowy Wielkie, Michałowo, Nipkowie, Olbrachtówko, Olbrachtowo, Piaski, Piotrkowo, Redaki, Róża, Różanki, Różnowo, Rudniki, Rumunki, Stawiec, Ulnowo, Wądoły, Wiśniówek, Żakowice, Zieleń and Zofiówka.

Neighbouring gminas
Gmina Susz is bordered by the gminas of Iława, Kisielice, Prabuty, Stary Dzierzgoń and Zalewo.

References
Polish official population figures 2006

Susz
Iława County